Glyphidocera elpista is a moth in the family Autostichidae. It was described by Walsingham in 1911. It is found in Panama.

The wingspan is about 10 mm. The forewings are fawn-ochreous, thickly sprinkled with fuscous, especially on the outer third. The discal spots are but faintly indicated, the median spot reaching to the fold, the outer one, slightly more distinct, at the end of the cell. The hindwings are brownish grey.

References

Moths described in 1911
Glyphidocerinae